Streptomyces fractus is a bacterium species from the genus of Streptomyces which has been isolated from the termite Amitermes hastatus from the Tygerberg Nature Reserve in South Africa.

See also 
 List of Streptomyces species

References 

 

fractus
Bacteria described in 2016